Põhimaantee 4 (ofcl. abbr. T4; also known as Pärnu Highway) is a 192-kilometre-long north-south national main road in Estonia. The route follows the same path as the European route E67, also known as the Via Baltica. The highway starts in Tallinn. From there the main cities passed are Saue, Märjamaa and Pärnu. The highway ends in Ikla at the Latvian border.

The road forms a major transport north–south transport route between Estonia and Central/Western Europe. In 2020, the highest traffic volumes were around Tallinn, with the AADT there being around 28,000. These are the second highest figures in Estonia, only being surpassed by the T1 outside Tallinn. The figures rise again around Pärnu, hovering around 10,000.

The road is a dual carriageway for 14.1 kilometres. The section is between Laagri and Ääsmäe which was built during the Soviet era. The section between Ääsmäe and Kustja has a 2+1 profile. Another 2+1 section is between Jänesselja and Nurme.

Route description
The T4 is a major north–south highway in Estonia connecting the capital of the country, Tallinn, to the fourth largest city in Estonia, Pärnu, and ultimately the Latvian border (where the Latvian A1 continues to Riga). The T4 is a part of the European route E67, also known as the Via Baltica.

The route bypasses all cities and towns, only having a 13-kilometre stretch in Tallinn. The highway begins in Tallinn from Viru Square and runs through the city for 13 kilometres. In the city, it intersects with the T8 at Freedom Square and the T15 at Järve. Shortly after crossing city borders, the road turns into a dual carriageway and interchanges with the T11 at Saue. At kilometre 27, the road meets with the T9 and turns into a 2+1 road. The road stays that way until Kustja, when the road turns into a regular 1+1 highway. The road continues in a straight, southbound manner until Pärnu. Before entering Pärnu, there is again a short 2+1 section between Jänesselja and Nurme.

At Pärnu, the road turns left onto the Pärnu bypass (with a 70 km/h speed limit). The road has an intersection with the T5 here and crosses the Pärnu river. After this, the road turns left again, and shortly after Pärnu intersects with the T6. Afterwards the route follows the Estonian coast until Ikla, where the Latvian border is crossed and the road continues as the A1 in Latvia.

Currently there are 11 speed cameras on the T4, between kilometres 92 and 141.

Road length of lane

See also
 Transport in Estonia

References

External links

N4